In geology, bedrock is solid rock that lies under loose material (regolith) within the crust of Earth or another terrestrial planet.

Definition 
Bedrock is the solid rock that underlies looser surface material. An exposed portion of bedrock is often called an outcrop. The various kinds of broken and weathered rock material, such as soil and subsoil, that may overlie the bedrock are known as regolith.

Engineering geology 
The surface of the bedrock beneath the soil cover (regolith) is also known as rockhead in engineering geology, and its identification by digging, drilling or geophysical methods is an important task in most civil engineering projects. Superficial deposits can be very thick, such that the bedrock lies hundreds of meters below the surface.

Weathering of bedrock 
Exposed bedrock experiences weathering, which may be physical or chemical, and which alters the structure of the rock to leave it susceptible to erosion. Bedrock may also experience subsurface weathering at its upper boundary, forming saprolite.

Geologic map 
A geologic map of an area will usually show the distribution of differing bedrock types, rock that would be exposed at the surface if all soil or other superficial deposits were removed. Where superficial deposits are so thick that the underlying bedrock cannot be reliably mapped, the superficial deposits will be mapped instead (for example, as alluvium).

See also

References

Further reading

External links 
 

Geology
Petrology
Rocks
Earth's crust